Solaiman Solaiman (born 6 May 1990 in Syria) is a Syrian footballer. He currently plays for Al-Wahda, which competes in the Syrian Premier League, the top division in Syria.

Club career
Solaiman began his professional career with Syrian Premier League club Al Futowa. He joined the senior squad on 2008, then joined Al-Wahda in the 2012-2013 season, and together won the Syrian Cup.

International career
Solaiman was a part of the Syrian U-17 national team in the 2007 FIFA U-17 World Cup in South Korea. He plays against Argentina, Spain and Honduras in the group-stage of the 2007 FIFA U-17 World Cup and he scored one goal against Spain in the third match of the group-stage.

References

External links
 Career stats at goalzz.com

1990 births
Living people
Syrian footballers
Association football defenders
Syrian Premier League players
Syria international footballers